Solomon Afful (born 28 July 1994) is a Ghanaian sprinter who specializes in the 100 and 200 metres.

At the 2012 World Junior Championships he reached the semi-final of the 200 metres and competed in the 4 × 400 metres relay. At the 2014 Commonwealth Games he did not reach past the initial heat in the 100, 200 or relay.

At the 2014 African Championships he reached the semi-final in both 100 and 200 metres, and won a silver medal in the 4 × 100 metres relay. He then won another medal in the 4 × 100 metres relay at the 2015 African Games, a bronze medal.

His personal best times are 10.39 seconds in the 100 metres, achieved in May 2015 in Hutchinson; and 20.68 seconds in the 200 metres, achieved in May 2015 in El Dorado (counted by the IAAF despite having no wind information).

References

1994 births
Living people
Ghanaian male sprinters
Commonwealth Games competitors for Ghana
Athletes (track and field) at the 2014 Commonwealth Games
African Games bronze medalists for Ghana
African Games medalists in athletics (track and field)
Athletes (track and field) at the 2015 African Games